Cuélebre (Asturian) or Culebre (Cantabrian), is a giant winged serpent-dragon of the Asturian and Cantabrian mythology, that lives in a cave, guards treasures and keeps anjanas (also known as xanas) as prisoners. Although they are immortal, the cuélebre age, and their scales become thick and impenetrable, and bat wings grow in their bodies. They must eventually flee Asturias and fly to the Mar Cuajada, a paradise located beyond the sea.

They do not usually move, but when they do it, it is in order to eat cattle and people. One could kill the cuélebre by giving them a red-hot stone or a bread full of pins to consume. Its spit it is said to turn into a magic stone, which heals many diseases.

In Midsummer, which is a magical night in Asturian and Cantabrian folklore, it is possible for brave men to defeat the cuélebre, whose spells don't take effect that night, and marry the xana and get the treasure. However, in Cantabrian areas it is said the night of Saint Bartholomew is a period in which the creature increases his power and unleashes all his fury against people in revenge.

See also
La Guita Xica

Asturian mythology
Cantabrian legendary creatures
European dragons